Philippe Hersant, born in 1957, is the current leader of Hersant Media Group and the last son of Robert Hersant (1920 -1996 ), who was nicknamed "papivore" because of his insatiable appetite for buying newspaper and magazine companies.

In the 2000s, due to the considerable debt of the Hersant Media Group, he was forced to sell many titles. In March 2004, he sells Socpresse to Serge Dassault, which already held 30%. In 2005, he also has to sell the 40% stake in Rossel.

References

Hersant family
20th-century French newspaper publishers (people)
Living people
1957 births